Acheroraptor is an extinct genus of dromaeosaurid theropod dinosaur known from the latest Maastrichtian Hell Creek Formation of Montana, United States. It contains a single species, Acheroraptor temertyorum. A. temertyorum is one of the two geologically youngest known species of dromaeosaurids, the other being Dakotaraptor, which is also known from Hell Creek. A basal cousin of Velociraptor, Acheroraptor is known from upper and lower jaw material.

Discovery and naming 

Acheroraptor was first described and named by David C. Evans, Derek W. Larson and Philip J. Currie in 2013 and the type species is Acheroraptor temertyorum. The generic name is derived from the Greek Ἀχέρων, Acheron, "underworld", in reference to the provenance from the Hell Creek Formation, and the Latin raptor, "thief". The specific name honours James and Louise Temerty, the chairman of Northland Power and the ROM Board of Governors and his wife, who have supported the museum for many years.

Acheroraptor is known from the holotype ROM 63777, a complete right maxilla with several maxillary teeth (some isolated), and from a referred dentary (lower jaw) ROM 63778, both housed at the Royal Ontario Museum, Canada. Both specimens were collected approximately four metres from one another, from the same mixed faunal bonebed that occurs in the upper part of the Hell Creek Formation of Montana, dating to the latest Maastrichtian stage of the Late Cretaceous, immediately prior to the Cretaceous–Paleogene extinction event. The holotype specimen was collected on August 28, 2009, by commercial fossil hunters, one of whom also collected the dentary several years later, and who were later able to provide detailed geographic data from GPS and photographs of the specimen in situ in the ground on the day of discovery. Both specimens were subsequently purchased by the Royal Ontario Museum from a private collector.

Classification 

The phylogenetic position of Acheroraptor was explored by Evans et al. (2013) using several data matrices. Both specimens of Acheroraptor were coded as a single taxon into Turner et al. (2012) data matrix, an extensive phylogenetic analysis of theropods that focuses on maniraptorans. Acheroraptor was recovered as a member of the clade containing Eudromaeosauria and Microraptorinae, confirming its referral to the Dromaeosauridae, and possibly to Eudromaeosauria. Within that clade, however, most taxa were recovered in a large polytomy, due to the limited codings available for Acheroraptor.

Evans et al. (2013) also coded the specimens of Acheroraptor (together and separately) into an updated version of the smaller, dromaeosaur-specific dataset from Longrich and Currie (2009). Velociraptor osmolskae and Balaur bondoc were added, Itemirus was excluded (following its identification as a tyrannosauroid by Miyashita and Currie (2009)), and following Turner et al. (2012) the codings for Adasaurus mongoliensis were separated into these based on the holotype from the Nemegt Formation, and these based on IGM 100/23 from the Bayanshiree Formation. Several characters were also rescored and modified, and two maxillary characters were added to the matrix from Turner et al. (2012). This analysis yielded a more resolved topology, placing Acheroraptor in a relatively basal position within the Velociraptorinae, which was otherwise found to include only Asian dromaeosaurids. The cladogram below shows the phylogenetic position of Acheroraptor following this analysis.

A 2022 study of eudromaeosauria reclassified Acheroraptor as a derived member of Saurornitholestinae, with Atrociraptor as its sister taxon.

Paleoecology 

Acheroraptor is the youngest species of dromaeosaurid, and is from the Hell Creek Formation. The Hell Creek Formation is from the time of the Cretaceous-Paleogene Extinction Event, and has been dated to 66 ± 0.07 million years ago. Many animals and plants have been found in the Hell Creek Formation, the discovery site of Acheroraptor. As it is known from the Tyrannosaurus-Triceratops fauna, Acheroraptor is the youngest dromaeosaurid, along with the much larger Dakotaraptor.

Evans et al. found that Acheroraptor was the only dromaeosaurid from the Hell Creek Formation. Common teeth previously referred to Dromaeosaurus and Saurornitholestes would then be considered Acheroraptor. Evans et al. also concluded that there was probably only one dromaeosaurid in the Hell Creek-Lance assemblage. In 2015, this view was disproven, with the description of Dakotaraptor, a far larger second dromaeosaur from the formation. Other non-dromaeosaurid theropods from the formation are tyrannosaurids, ornithomimids, troodontids, birds, and caenagnathids. The tyrannosaurids from the formation are Nanotyrannus and Tyrannosaurus, although the former might be a junior synonym of the latter. Among ornithomimids are the genera Struthiomimus as well as Ornithomimus, and "Orcomimus." The birds known from the formation are Avisaurus, Brodavis baileyi, and two unnamed hesperornithoforms, possibly Potamornis. Only three oviraptorosaurs are from the Hell Creek Formation, Anzu, Leptorhynchos and third and undescribed specimen, very similar to Gigantoraptor, from South Dakota. However, only fossilized foot prints were discovered as of 2016. The known troodontids from this formation include Troodon, Pectinodon, and Paronychodon. A single species of coelurosaur is known from similar fossil formations includes Richardoestesia.

Ornithischians are abundant in the Hell Creek Formation. The main groups of ornithischians are ankylosaurians, ornithopods, ceratopsians, and pachycephalosaurians. One ankylosaurian and two nodosaurians are known, Ankylosaurus, Denversaurus and possibly Edmontonia. Multiple genera of ceratopsians are known from the formation, the leptoceratopsid Leptoceratops and the chasmosaurines Nedoceratops, Torosaurus, Triceratops, and Tatankaceratops. Hadrosaurs are common in the Hell Creek Formation, and are known from multiple species of the ornithopod Thescelosaurus, and the hadrosaurids Edmontosaurus, and an undescribed genus similar to Parasaurolophus. Five pachycephalosaurians have been found in the Hell Creek Formation. Among them are the derived pachycephalosaurids Sphaerotholus, Stygimoloch, Dracorex, Pachycephalosaurus, and an undescribed specimen from North Dakota.

Mammals are plentiful in the Hell Creek Formation. Groups represented include multituberculates, metatherians, and eutherians. The multituberculates represented include Paracimexomys, the cimolomyids Paressonodon, Meniscoessus, Essonodon, Cimolomys, Cimolodon, and Cimexomys; and the neoplagiaulacids Mesodma, and Neoplagiaulax. The alphadontids Alphadon, Protalphodon, and Turgidodon, pediomyids Pediomys, Protolambda, and Leptalestes, the stagodontid Didelphodon, the deltatheridiid Nanocuris, the herpetotheriid Nortedelphys, and the glasbiid Glasbius all represent metatherians of the Hell Creek Formation. A few eutherians are known, being represented by Alostera, Protungulatum, the cimolestids Cimolestes and Batodon, the gypsonictopsid Gypsonictops, and the possible nyctitheriid Paranyctoides.

See also 
 Timeline of dromaeosaurid research

References 

Eudromaeosaurs
Late Cretaceous dinosaurs of North America
Fossil taxa described in 2013
Maastrichtian life
Taxa named by Philip J. Currie
Hell Creek fauna
Paleontology in Montana
Maastrichtian genus first appearances
Maastrichtian genus extinctions